Elections for the National Revolutionary Assembly were held in Benin on 20 November 1979. At the time, the country was a one-party state under the People's Revolutionary Party of Benin, with voters given the choice of approving the party's list of 336 candidates or not. The list was approved by 98% of voters, with an 81% turnout. Following the election, Mathieu Kérékou was elected President (unopposed) by the Assembly on 6 February 1980.

Results

Assembly members
Rather than geographical constituencies, seats were divided up by professions.

References

Elections in Benin
Benin
Parliamentary
National Assembly (Benin)
One-party elections
Benin